A flexible impeller pump is a positive-displacement pump that, by deforming impeller vanes, draws the liquid into the pump housing and moves it to the discharge port with a constant flow rate.  The flexibility of the vanes enables a tight seal to the internal housing, making the pump self-priming, while also permitting bi-directional operation.  The output from these pumps tends to be smooth or gentle when compared to the operation of a reciprocating pump (for example). In 1938, Arthur M. Briggs filed a patent for this type of pump.

Types
 Execution: close coupled, bare shaft, with hydraulic motor, belt driven, gearmotor, mechanical speed variator, frequency converter,...  
 Fittings: DIN 11851, Garolla, BSP, Macon, Triclover, SMS, BSM/RJT,...

Uses
Particularly suitable for transfer of viscous, delicate, and slurry fluids even with high solid content. Widely used in the oenological field, food processing, chemical industry, cosmetic and marine field.

Materials  
Pump housing can be made of high grade stainless steel, bronze for marine applications, or other materials.

The impeller can be made of:

 Natural Rubber (NR) - Excellent for water based liquid, highest mechanical resistance. 
 Neoprene (CR) - Good balance between chemical and mechanical resistance. 
 Nitrile (NBR) - Excellent resistance to oils and fats. 
 EPDM - Best for hot fluid, for acid and alkaline fluids. 
 Silicone (VMQ) - Best for very high temperature.

The end face mechanical seal can be made of:

 Ceramic
 Stainless steel
 Graphite
 Tungsten carbide
 Silicon carbide
 Elastomers, such as NBR, EPDM, or VITON

References

Pumps